The Sibe language (also Sibo, Xibe) is a Tungusic language spoken by members of the Sibe minority of Xinjiang, in Northwest China.

Classification
Sibe is conventionally viewed as a separate language within the southern group of Tungusic languages alongside the more well-known Manchu language, having undergone more than 200 years of development separated from the Tungusic-speaking heartland since Sibe troops were dispatched to the Xinjiang frontiers in 1764. Some researchers such as Jerry Norman hold that Sibe is a dialect of Manchu, whereas Xibologists such as An Jun argue that Sibe should be considered the "successor" to Manchu. Ethnohistorically, the Sibe people are not considered Manchu people, because they were excluded from chieftain Nurhaci's 17th-century tribal confederation to which the name "Manchu" was later applied.

Phonology
Sibe is mutually intelligible with Manchu, although unlike Manchu, Sibe has reported to have eight vowel distinctions as opposed to the six found in Manchu, as well as differences in morphology, and a more complex system of vowel harmony.

Consonants 

Vowels 

Morphology 
Sibe has seven case morphemes, three of which are used quite differently from modern Manchu. The categorization of morphemes as case markers in spoken Sibe is partially controversial due to the status of numerous suffixes in the language. Despite the general controversy about the categorization of case markers versus postpositions in Tungusic languages, four case markers in Sibe are shared with literary Manchu (Nominative, Genitive, Dative-Locative and Accusative). Sibe's three innovated cases - the ablative, lative, and instrumental-sociative share their meanings with similar case forms in neighboring Uyghur, Kazakh, and Oiryat Mongolian.

Lexicon
The general vocabulary and structure of Sibe has not been affected as much by Chinese as Manchu has. However, Sibe has absorbed a large body of Chinese sociological terminology, especially in politics: like gəming ("revolution", from ) and zhuxi ("chairperson", from ), and economics: like chūna ("cashier", from ) and daikuan ("loan", from ). Written Sibe is more conservative and rejecting of loanwords, but spoken Sibe contains additional Chinese-derived vocabulary such as nan (from ) for "man" where the Manchu-based equivalent is niyalma. There has also been some influence from Russian, including words such as konsul ("consul", from ) and mashina ("sewing machine", from ). Smaller Xinjiang languages contribute mostly cultural terminology, such as namas ("an Islamic feast") from Uygur and baige ("horse race") from Kazakh.

Writing system

Sibe is written in a derivative of the Manchu alphabet. The Sibe alphabet diverges from the Manchu alphabet in that the positions of the letters in some words have changed, Sibe lacks 13 out of 131 syllables in Manchu, and Sibe has three syllables that are not found in Manchu (wi, wo, and wu).

The table below lists the letters in Sibe that differentiate it from Manchu as well as the placement of the letters. Blue areas mark letters with different shapes from Manchu, green areas marks different Unicode codes from Manchu.

Cyrillization proposal
There was a proposal in China by 1957 to adapt the Cyrillic alphabet to Sibe, but this was abandoned in favor of the original Sibe script.

Usage

In 1998, there were eight primary schools that taught Sibe in the Qapqal Xibe Autonomous County where the medium of instruction was Chinese, but Sibe lessons were mandatory. From 1954 to 1959, the People's Publishing House in Ürümqi published over 285 significant works, including government documents, belles-lettres, and schoolbooks, in Sibe. Since 1946, the Sibe-language Qapqal News has been published in Yining. In Qapqal, Sibe-language programming is allocated 15 minutes per day of radio broadcasting and 15 to 30-minute television programmes broadcast once or twice per month.

Sibe is taught as a second language at the Ili Normal University in the Ili Kazakh Autonomous Prefecture of northern Xinjiang; it established an undergraduate major in the language in 2005. A few Manchu language enthusiasts from Eastern China have visited Qapqal Sibe County in order to experience an environment where a variety closely related to Manchu is spoken natively.

Notes

References

Further reading

External links

Mini Buleku: A Recorded Sibe Dictionary
Abkai — Unicode Manchu/Sibe/Daur Fonts and Keyboards
SibeCulture.com: Sibe-English-Chinese phrases

Agglutinative languages
Tungusic languages
Languages of China
Sibe people
Manchu language